The Warche is a river in eastern Belgium (province of Liège).

It passes through the town of Malmedy, and the artificial lakes of Robertville and of Bütgenbach are formed by dams on the Warche.

It is a right tributary of the river Amblève, which it joins east of Stavelot.

In the past the Warche used to flow northward from Bévercé, following the current Trô Maret valley, to continue through the current Eau Rouge valley. This last valley is much larger than can be expected from such a small flow, still representing the original Warche valley. In that time the Warche confluenced with the Amblève at Stavelot. Later on, probably during the last ice age the Warche adopted its current position, flowing through the Malmedy graben.

References
 eastbelgium.com: « sentier de découverte » dans la vallée de la Warche (in French)

Rivers of the Ardennes (Belgium)
Rivers of Belgium
Rivers of Liège Province
Büllingen
Bütgenbach
Malmedy
Stavelot
Waimes
Rivers of the Eifel